pc Quest was a pop music group in the 1990s from Oklahoma. They were managed by George Tobin, best known for managing Tiffany, and Tim James, one half of the duo Rock Mafia. They were featured in Bop and Teen Beat magazine as teen idols.

The quartet was originally signed to Geffen Records in 1990, but an initial release of "After The Summer's Gone" that fall to Contemporary hit radio stations through both Geffen and Giant Records failed to chart. Months later, now signed to Tobin's Headlinerecords and RCA Records, their "Can I Call You My Girl?" became a minor hit, followed by a reissue of "After The Summer's Gone", which narrowly missed the top 40 on the Billboard Hot 100. A 1992 follow-up album failed to yield any hits, and the group parted ways. 

Group member Chad Petree would find success years later as one of the leaders of indie rock band Shiny Toy Guns, with brother Stephen credited as a writer on several of the band's songs.

Members
Chad Petree
Stephen Petree
Drew Nichols
Kim Whipkey

Discography
pc Quest (1991)
Directions (1992)

Singles
 "Can I Call You My Girl" #58 Hot 100 (1991)
 "After the Summer's Gone" #41 Hot 100 (1991)

External links
 pc Quest at Discogs
 [ pc Quest] at Allmusic

American pop music groups
Musical groups established in 1990
Musical groups disestablished in 1992
Musical groups from Oklahoma